Charles Wilson Green (2 August 1932 – 28 January 2013) was a Scottish amateur golfer. He was one of the leading British amateurs of his generation.

As an individual, he won the Scottish Amateur three times, the Scottish Amateur Stroke Play Champion twice and the Lytham Trophy twice. He represented Great Britain and Ireland in five Walker Cup matches and twice in the Eisenhower Trophy. In 1962 he won the Silver Medal as the leading amateur in the Open Championship.

Amateur wins
1970 Scottish Amateur, Lytham Trophy
1974 Lytham Trophy (tied with Geoff Birtwell, Jim Farmer and Geoff Marks)
1975 Scottish Amateur Stroke Play Championship
1982 Scottish Amateur
1983 Scottish Amateur
1984 Scottish Amateur Stroke Play Championship

Team appearances
Walker Cup (representing Great Britain & Ireland): 1963, 1969, 1971 (winners), 1973, 1975, 1983 (non-playing captain), 1985 (non-playing captain)
Eisenhower Trophy (representing Great Britain & Ireland): 1970, 1972
St Andrews Trophy (representing Great Britain & Ireland): 1962 (winners), 1966 (winners), 1968 (winners), 1970 (winners), 1972 (winners), 1974, 1976 (winners)
Commonwealth Tournament (representing Great Britain): 1971
European Amateur Team Championship (representing Scotland): 1965, 1967, 1969, 1971, 1973, 1975 (winners), 1977 (winners), 1979

References

Scottish male golfers
Amateur golfers
Sportspeople from Dumbarton
1932 births
2013 deaths